Graham Teasdale (born 26 June 1955) is a former Australian rules football player who played for the Richmond Football Club in the Victorian Football League (VFL) between 1972 and 1975, for the South Melbourne Football Club from 1975 to 1981 and then for the Collingwood Football Club from 1982 to 1984.

While at Richmond, Teasdale played mainly in the under 19s, where he was one of the leading goalkickers, and in the reserves side. But the move to the Swans in 1975 saw him establish himself as a senior player. In his best season, 1977, Teasdale won the South Melbourne best and fairest and the Brownlow Medal with the highest score of 59 votes.

References 
 Hogan P: The Tigers Of Old, Richmond FC, Melbourne 1996

Bob Skilton Medal winners
Brownlow Medal winners
Collingwood Football Club players
Richmond Football Club players
Sydney Swans players
Australian rules footballers from Victoria (Australia)
1955 births
Living people